"Growing Up Is Getting Old" (stylised in all lowercase) is a song by Bulgarian singer Victoria released as a single on 19 March 2021 by Ligna Group and Ostereo Limited. The song represented Bulgaria in the Eurovision Song Contest 2021 in Rotterdam, the Netherlands. The song appears on her debut extended play A Little Dramatic.

Release and promotion 

An official music video was released on 10 March 2021. The long 5-minute music video starts with a black and white simulation of a news anchor announcing the cancellation of the Eurovision Song Contest for the first time ever. The music video closes with real black and white footage of Victoria as a child and footage of her family.

At Eurovision 

The song was selected to represent Bulgaria in the Eurovision Song Contest 2021, after Victoria Georgieva was internally selected by the national broadcaster. The semi-finals of the 2021 contest featured the same line-up of countries as determined by the draw for the 2020 contest's semi-finals. Bulgaria was placed into the second semi-final, held on 20 May 2021, and performed in the second half of the show. After placing third in the semi-final, the song reached the Grand Final and finished joint tenth with 170 points.

Charts

Release history

Notes

References 

Songs about old age
2021 songs
2021 singles
Eurovision songs of 2021
Eurovision songs of Bulgaria
Victoria Georgieva songs